FC Čechie Uhříněves is a football club located in Prague-Uhříněves, Czech Republic. It currently plays in the I.A třída skupina A – Praha, which is in the sixth tier of the Czech football system. The club took part in the first round of the 2012–13 Czech Cup.

References

External links
 FC Čechie Uhříněves at the website of the Prague Football Association 
 FC Čechie Uhříněves at Městská část Praha 22 

Football clubs in the Czech Republic
Football clubs in Prague
Association football clubs established in 1908
1908 establishments in Austria-Hungary